Gamdi is a Census town situated in Anand district of Gujarat, India.

Geography
The total geographic area of the Gamdi town is 6 square kilometers which makes it the biggest census town by area in Anand district.

Demographics
According to the 2011 Indian Census, Gamdi city consist of the total population of approximate 15,000 people. The literacy rate of Gamdi city is 87.60 percent, which is higher than Gujarat's literacy rate of 78.03 percent.

References

Cities and towns in Anand district